Lesja is the administrative centre of Lesja Municipality in Innlandet county, Norway. The European route E136 highway and the Raumabanen railway line both pass through the village, with the railway line stopping at the Lesja Station. Lesja Church is located in the village.

Since 2019, the population and area data for this village area has not been separately tracked by Statistics Norway.

References

Lesja
Villages in Innlandet